Gyrodon intermedius is a bolete fungus in the family Paxillaceae native to Africa, where it has been recorded from Congo, Liberia and Madagascar.

References

External links

Fungi described in 1895
Paxillaceae
Fungi of Africa